The 1978 Utah Utes football team was an American football team that represented the University of Utah as a member of the Western Athletic Conference (WAC) during the 1978 NCAA Division I-A football season. In their second season under head coach Wayne Howard, the Utes compiled an overall record of 8–3 with a mark of 4–2 against conference opponents, tying for second place in the WAC. Home games were played on campus at Robert Rice Stadium in Salt Lake City.

Schedule

Personnel

Game summaries

BYU

NFL draft
One Utah player was selected in the 1979 NFL Draft.

References

Utah
Utah Utes football seasons
Utah Utes football